Nonenal may refer to:

 2-Nonenal (see, Old person smell)
 6-Nonenal